William Wilson (died 1582) was an English politician.

He was a Member (MP) of the Parliament of England for Southwark in 1571.

References

Year of birth missing
1582 deaths
English MPs 1571